= Regas Automobile Company =

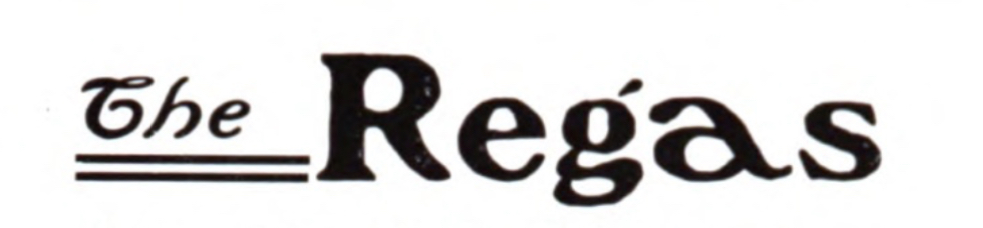
- Type: Automobile Manufacturing
- Industry: Automotive
- Genre: Touring cars
- Founded: 1903
- Founder: James Harry Sager, Willard G. Rich
- Defunct: 1905
- Headquarters: Rochester, New York, United States
- Area served: United States
- Products: Vehicles; Automotive parts bicycle

Regas was built by the Regas Automobile Company in Rochester, New York and advertised as "Air Cooled Waterless. Is an all „year round“ car." It had a distinctive air-cooled engine. The cars were manufactured between the years of 1903 and 1905. Regas founder, James Harry Sager, began manufacturing bicycle accessories with a partner, Willard G. Rich, as the Rich & Co. in 1891. The brand name for the Automobile Company was Regas, backwards for Sager.

== Overview of production figures ==
Year	Production	Model	Engine displacement	HP
1903		Model A		7
1904-1905		Model B	2606 cc (bore 114,3 mm, stroke 127 mm)	13
		Model C	4119 cc	20
1904-1905		Model G	4119 cc (bore 101.6 mm, stroke 127 mm)	20

== Gallery ==
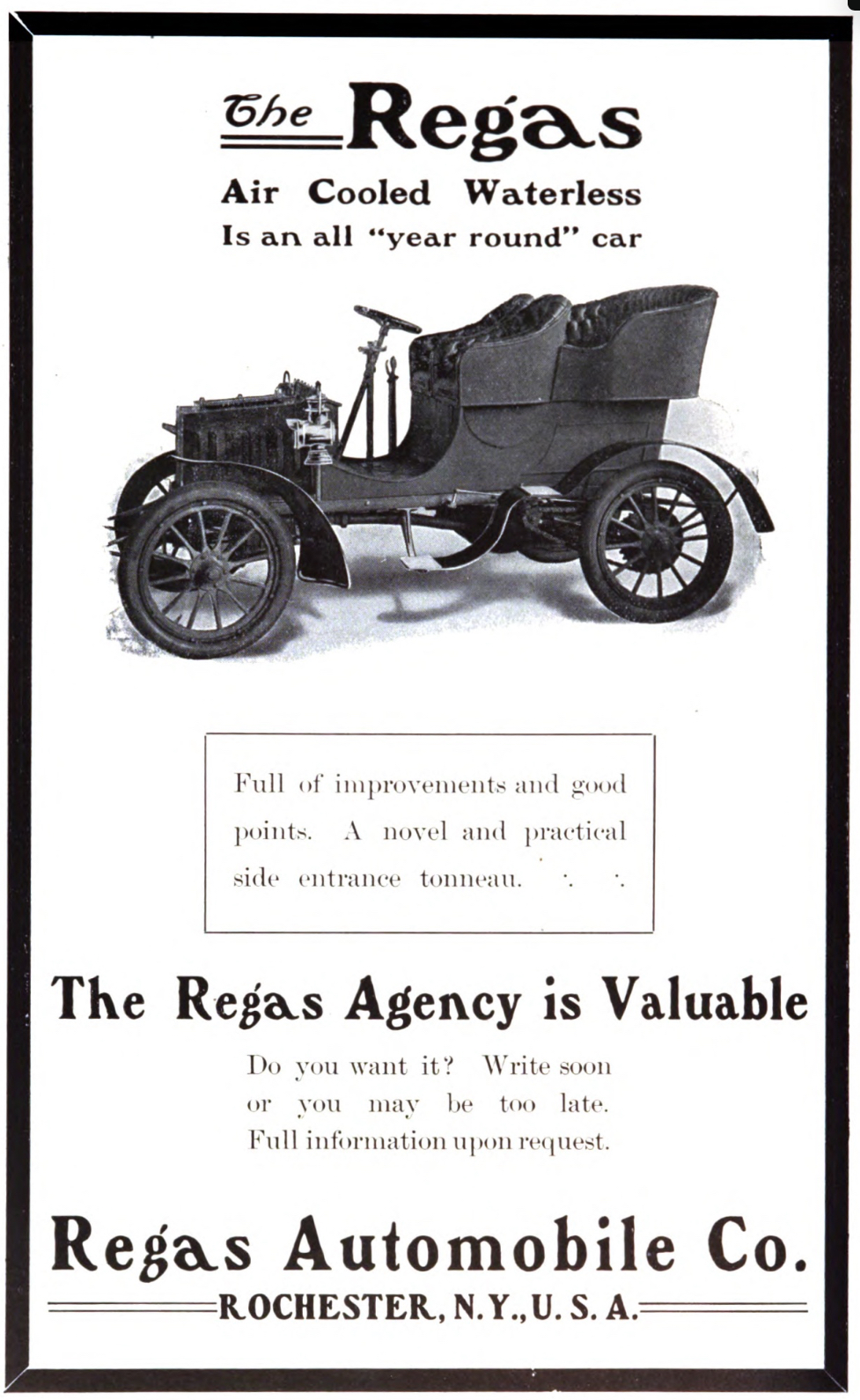
Regas Model B

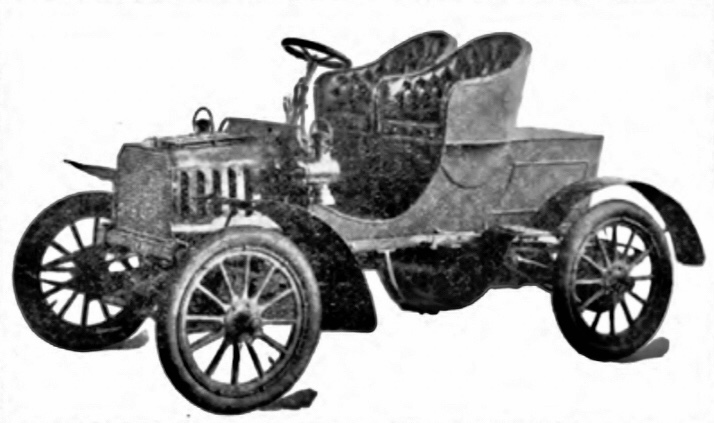
Regas Model G (1904-1905)
